The Denis Julien Inscription is an incised carving on a rock face in a side canyon of the Green River north of Canyonlands National Park in southwestern Grand County, Utah, United States. The inscription was left by trapper Denis Julien in 1836, when he was one of the few Europeans in southern Utah. The panel reads:

D. Julien
1836
3 mai 

A boat with a mast is depicted to the right of the lettering, with a bird-like object below. Later travelers have left their own markings nearby. The Julien is one of at least eight that he left in Utah between 1831 and 1844. The inscription is significant in depicting an apparent sailboat, supporting the theory that he sailed upstream against the current as the date progression of his inscriptions would imply. Nearby inscriptions left by Bureau of Reclamation employees in 1914 on a damsite survey expedition are also considered significant.

See also

 National Register of Historic Places listings in Grand County, Utah
 Julien Inscription Panel, a similar inscription in Arches National Park dated June 9, 1844
 Denis Julien Inscription (San Juan County, Utah), a similar inscription in Canyonlands National Park on the Colorado River that may not have been left by Julien, dated May 1836
 Denis Julien Inscription (Moffat County, Colorado) in Dinosaur National Monument

References

External links

 Julien Inscription Panel at Canyonlands National Park

National Register of Historic Places in Utah
Grand County, Utah
1836 works